The 2013–14 Florida State Seminoles men's basketball team, variously Florida State or FSU, represented Florida State University during the 2013–14 NCAA Division I men's basketball season. Florida State competes in Division I of the National Collegiate Athletic Association (NCAA). The Seminoles were led by twelfth year head coach Leonard Hamilton and played their home games at the Donald L. Tucker Center on the university's Tallahassee, Florida campus. They are members of the Atlantic Coast Conference.

Florida State finished the season 22–14, 9–9 in ACC play, to finish in a tie for seventh place. They lost in the quarterfinals of the ACC tournament to Virginia. They were invited to the National Invitation Tournament where they lost in the semifinals to Minnesota. The Seminoles achieved their eighteenth twenty-win season, the seventh under Hamilton, and advanced to the semifinals of the National Invitation Tournament for only the second time in school history.

Previous season

The Seminoles finished the 2012–13 season 18–16, 9–9 in ACC play, and lost in the 1st round of the NIT to Louisiana Tech.

Pre-season
Assistant coach Corey Williams left his position at Florida State to become the new head coach at Stetson. Former Georgia Southern head coach Charlton Young took over as an assistant.

Departures

2013 recruiting class

Prior to the start of the season, Xavier Rathan-Mayes was ruled out for the season due to being declared academically ineligible.

Roster

Depth chart

Coaching staff

Rankings

Schedule
Seminole Madness was held on October 11 at the Leon County Civic Center.

|-
!colspan=12 style="background:#; color:white;"| Exhibition

|-
!colspan=12 style="background:#; color:white;"| Non-conference regular season
|-

|-

|-
!colspan=12 style="background:#; color:white;"| ACC regular season
|-

|-
!colspan=12 style="background:#; color:white;"|ACC tournament

|-
!colspan=12 style="background:#; color:white;"| National Invitation tournament

Source: 2013–14 Florida State Seminoles basketball schedule

Media
Florida State basketball is broadcast on the Florida State University Seminoles Radio Network.

References

External links
 Official Team Website
 Almanac

Florida State
Florida State Seminoles men's basketball seasons
Florida State